Avra Milvin Warren (August 26, 1893 – January 23, 1957) served as the United States Ambassador to four countries and minister to three (although he served as Minister and later Ambassador to the Dominican Republic, so only six countries total).  

Warren was born in Ilchester, Howard County, Maryland.  He served in the United States Army during World War I.  He was appointed US Counsul at Cap-Haïtien in 1922, then served in Karachi, Pakistan, Nairobi, Kenya and St. John's, Newfoundland (all at the time part of the British Empire). In 1931 he was made US Counsul in Buenos Aires.  In 1932 he was advanced to the office of Consul General in that city in which office he served until 1935.  As of 1941 Warren was the chief of the Visa Division of the United States State Department. From 1942-1943 Warren served as United States Minister to the Dominican Republic, and then as Ambassador there from 1943-1944.  In 1944-1945 Warren served as US Ambassador to Panama.  He then served From 1945-1947 as US Minister to New Zealand.  From 1947-1950 he was US Minister to Finland.  From 1950-1952 Warren was United States Ambassador to Pakistan and then from 1953-1956 he was United States Ambassador to Turkey.

Warren married Mary Nicols Newman in 1923.

During his time as Chief of the Visa Division, Warren had earned the reputation in conjunction with Breckinridge Long, assistant secretary of state, of enforcing stringent immigration controls and of delaying where they could not deny acceptance of refugees from Nazi persecution. Max Nussbaum, former Rabbi from Berlin, writes in his testimony to Yad Vashem on June 30, 1958: "During those days after the outbreak of war, the American Vice consul Warren was the greatest misfortune for the Jews in Berlin. Inherently, emigration at that time was still possible since the USA had not yet entered the war and the Germans still approved applications. However, Warren sabotaged the whole emigration procedure and he is responsible for the death of hundreds of Jews since he declined to issue an already granted visa on the day it was needed for technical reasons. He postponed the issuance of the visa with the result that in the meantime the candidate for emigration was deported into a concentration camp."

He died in Dallas, Texas on January 23, 1957.

Sources

political graveyard entry on Warren

1893 births
Ambassadors of the United States to Pakistan
Ambassadors of the United States to the Dominican Republic
Ambassadors of the United States to Panama
Ambassadors of the United States to Turkey
1957 deaths
People from Ilchester, Maryland
Ambassadors of the United States to Finland
American consuls
20th-century American diplomats